Munitions India Limited (MIL) is an Indian state-owned defence company, headquartered in Pune, India established in 2021 as part of the restructuring and corporatisation of the Ordnance Factory Board into seven different Public Sector Undertakings. Munitions India primarily manufactures ammunition, explosives, rockets and bombs for the use of the Indian Armed Forces, foreign militaries and domestic civilian use.

Some notable products of Munitions India include:

See also
Other PSUs formed from Ordnance Factory Board:-
Advanced Weapons and Equipment India Limited (AWE), Kanpur
Armoured Vehicles Nigam Limited (AVANI), Chennai
Gliders India Limited (GIL), Kanpur
India Optel Limited (IOL), Dehradun
Troop Comforts Limited (TCL), Kanpur
Yantra India Limited (YIL), Nagpur

References

Defence companies of India
Government-owned companies of India
Indian companies established in 2021